Rogério Fidélis Régis (born 28 February 1976 in Campinas, São Paulo), known simply as Rogério, is a Brazilian retired footballer who played as a right back or a right midfielder.

Club career
After emerging through lowly União São João Esporte Clube's youth ranks, Rogério had a steady career with country giants Sociedade Esportiva Palmeiras and Sport Club Corinthians Paulista, being essential in the former side's conquest of the 1999 edition of the Libertadores Cup; in 2002, playing as a right-back, he often duelled with Santos FC's Robinho during the national championship final, won by the opposition 5–2 on aggregate.

In 2004, aged 28, Rogério moved abroad, signing a three-year contract with Sporting Clube de Portugal. Playing both positions on the right flank during his first season, he helped the Lisbon-based team to the campaign's UEFA Cup final, played on home soil: he scored the opener in the decisive match, but in an eventual 1–3 loss against PFC CSKA Moscow.

Losing importance in the next year, Rogério returned to his country, first on loan at Fluminense FC. He retired in 2008 after one-year spells with Itumbiara Esporte Clube, Esporte Clube Santo André and Associação Desportiva São Caetano.

In 2011, after three years out of football, 35-year-old Rogério returned to active, playing in the lower leagues of his country.

Honours
Campeonato Paulista: 1996, 2001, 2003
Copa do Brasil: 1998, 2002
Copa Mercosur: 1998
Copa Libertadores: 1999
Torneio Rio-São Paulo: 2000, 2002
UEFA Cup: Runner-up 2004–05

References

External links
 CBF data 
 
 
 

1976 births
Living people
Footballers from São Paulo (state)
Brazilian footballers
Association football defenders
Association football midfielders
Campeonato Brasileiro Série A players
Campeonato Brasileiro Série B players
União São João Esporte Clube players
Sociedade Esportiva Palmeiras players
Sport Club Corinthians Paulista players
Fluminense FC players
Esporte Clube Santo André players
Associação Desportiva São Caetano players
Primeira Liga players
Copa Libertadores-winning players
Sporting CP footballers
Brazil international footballers
Brazilian expatriate footballers
Expatriate footballers in Portugal
Brazilian expatriate sportspeople in Portugal